Ramil Gasimov (born 13 August 1981) is an Azerbaijani paralympic judoka, acting in a weight up to 73 kilograms and category B2 blindness, world champion in 2014 and two-time European champion in 2013 and 2015. The winner of the 2007 Summer Universiade in Bangkok. He took part in the 2008 Summer Olympics in Beijing. Representing Azerbaijan at the 2016 Summer Paralympics in Rio de Janeiro, which won the gold medal.

References

External links

 
 

 Videos of Ramil Gasimov in action (judovision.org)

1981 births
Living people
Azerbaijani male judoka
Olympic judoka of Azerbaijan
Paralympic judoka of Azerbaijan
Paralympic gold medalists for Azerbaijan
Paralympic medalists in judo
Judoka at the 2008 Summer Olympics
Judoka at the 2016 Summer Paralympics
Medalists at the 2016 Summer Paralympics
Universiade medalists in judo
Universiade gold medalists for Azerbaijan
Medalists at the 2007 Summer Universiade
20th-century Azerbaijani people
21st-century Azerbaijani people